Dr Murray Paterson (born 1963) is an Australian songwriter and musician most notable for his collaborations with Tex Perkins and his own recording project, Headland.

The main vehicle for Paterson's collaborations with Tex Perkins was the band Dark Horses, but he also contributed to albums by Tex, Don and Charlie.

Paterson and Perkins co-scored the soundtrack for the film Beautiful Kate, the directorial feature debut from Rachel Ward. With Perkins he received an ARIA nomination in 2009 for Best Original Soundtrack/Cast/Show Album for the soundtrack.

Headland began as a film retrieval project in which 8mm film shot by amateur moviemakers involved with the Northern NSW surf culture in the 1970s was collected and archived by Paterson. The resulting score LP, sound/track (HL01), was released in Australia in 2013 followed by a 2014 release in the UK and Europe. Subsequent Headland releases are the LPs True Flowers from This Painted World (HL03, 2017) and What Rough Beast (AGIT54, 2019) which was released in the UK through Agitated Records. A vinyl EP, Cosy (HL02), was released in 2014.

Headland has also released, as digital downloads, the soundtracks from films by Australian filmmaker Ishka Folkwell: A Sense of Space (HL04, 2018)  Nordurland (HL05, 2019) On Top of the World (HL06, 2020) Lost Track New Zealand (HL07, 2021) Bonney Upwelling (HL08, 2021) Lost Track Atlantic: Episode 1 (HL09, 2021).

The collective of musicians is directed by multi-instrumentalist Paterson. Members include Joel Silbersher (vocals, guitar), Les Dorahy (accordion), Ken Gormly (bass), Brock Fitzgerald (drums), Melissa Hunt (double bass, Amanda Brown (musician) (violin), Skritch Needham (drums), Luke Peacock (keyboards) and Michael White (keyboards).

MOJO Magazine gave True Flowers from This Painted World 4 Stars.
The Sydney Morning Herald made sound/track album of the week and awarded it 4 Stars.
MOJO Magazine gave What Rough Beast 4 Stars.

Dr Paterson lectured in Contemporary Art Theory at Southern Cross University, Lismore, New South Wales between 1999 and 2013. He received his Doctorate of Philosophy for the ficto-critical work Wonderstruck.

Discography

Albums

Awards and nominations

ARIA Music Awards
The ARIA Music Awards is an annual awards ceremony that recognises excellence, innovation, and achievement across all genres of Australian music. They commenced in 1987. 

! 
|-
| 2009
| Beautiful Kate (with Tex Perkins)
| Best Original Soundtrack, Cast or Show Album
| 
| 
|-

References

1963 births
Living people
Australian songwriters
Academic staff of Southern Cross University